Mount Plymouth is an unincorporated community and census-designated place (CDP) in Lake County, Florida, United States. As of the 2010 census, the CDP population was 4,011, up from 2,814 in 2000. It is part of the Orlando–Kissimmee Metropolitan Statistical Area.

History

The Historic Mount Plymouth Hotel, built in 1926 at the cost of $350,000, was the centerpiece of a golfing resort for the area. The hotel became a center of activity in the area. Guests such as Al Capone, Connie Mack, Babe Ruth and Kate Smith were able to utilize the hotel's airfield for arrival.

Four 18-hole golf courses patterned after the St. Andrews course in Scotland were originally planned for the resort. However, the Florida real estate crash of 1926 prevented completion of three of the four courses. The first course, called Mount Plymouth Golf Club, closed in 2007. Lucia Mida would use Mount Plymouth as her temporary place of residence while participating in Florida state golfing tournaments.

In 1959, Florida Central Academy occupied the building and grounds of the 150-room hotel. Originally a boys boarding school, in 1971 the academy began accepting girls. The school remained operational until June 1983. The building, condemned by county health officials, quickly became the target of vandals. In 1986 and 1987, fire destroyed the building.

Geography
It is bordered to the south by the city of Apopka in Orange County. Florida State Road 46 passes through the center of the community, leading east  to Sanford and west  to Mount Dora. Florida State Road 429, the Wekiva Parkway, passes east and south of Mount Plymouth, leading south around the west side of the Orlando area  to Interstate 4.

Climate

Demographics

As of the census of 2010, there were 4,011 people, 1,080 households, and 811 families residing in the CDP. The racial makeup of the CDP was 88.33% White, 5.06% African American, 0.92% Native American, 0.62% Asian, 0.18% Pacific Islander, 2.84% from other races, and 2.22% from two or more races. Hispanic or Latino of any race were 9.37% of the population.

There were 1,080 households, out of which 33.1% had children under the age of 18 living with them, 62.5% were married couples living together, 8.5% had a female householder with no husband present, and 24.9% were non-families. 18.5% of all households were made up of individuals, and 7.7% had someone living alone who was 65 years of age or older.  The average household size was 2.61 and the average family size was 2.97.

In the CDP, the age distribution of the population shows 25.2% under the age of 18, 6.2% from 18 to 24, 30.8% from 25 to 44, 24.1% from 45 to 64, and 13.8% who were 65 years of age or older.  The median age was 39 years. For every 100 females, there were 95.0 males.  For every 100 females age 18 and over, there were 92.8 males.

The median income for a household in the CDP was $42,530, and the median income for a family was $45,089. Males had a median income of $31,324 versus $21,621 for females. The per capita income for the CDP was $17,182.  About 2.1% of families and 6.6% of the population were below the poverty line, including 1.8% of those under age 18 and 7.8% of those age 65 or over.

Notable person
Nancy Walters, actress

References

Census-designated places in Lake County, Florida
Greater Orlando
Census-designated places in Florida